Pascual Nicolás Pérez (May 4, 1926 – January 22, 1977) was an Argentine flyweight boxer. Pérez was born in Tupungato in the Mendoza Province of Argentina, he went on to make history by becoming Argentina's first world boxing champion.

Pérez usually did poor at the ticket gates in Argentina after he became world champion, forcing him to defend his world title on the road many times and to become known as a world-traveling champion. His first international success was a gold medal at the 1948 Summer Olympics in United Kingdom.

He and Delfo Cabrera were the only two Argentinians to be an Olympic gold medalists in the London Olympics of 1948. Perez reigned as World Champion from 1954 to 1960. As an amateur he fought 125 bouts. Turning professional in 1952, he fought 92 fights (84 wins, 7 losses and 1 draw), in which he won 57 fights by knockout, a record that places him in an elite group of boxers who have won more than 50 fights by knockouts. He defended his title against nine contenders in a span of six years. He is considered one of the three greatest flyweight boxers in history alongside Miguel Canto and Jimmy Wilde. Along with Carlos Monzon, he is considered one of the best fighters ever to box. He has been inducted in the International Boxing Hall of Fame. In 2004, the American Boxing Confederation posthumously declared him the South American champion.

Early life
Pérez was born into a family of winemakers in the Uco Valley, Tupungato district of the Mendoza province, where he was the youngest of nine children. He worked as a laborer for the family since childhood. In 1942, at age 16, Perez started boxing at the Rodeo Deportivo de la Cruz, led by Felipe Segura, Perez showing superb skill and power, unusual for a lighter weight boxer. Though naturally left-handed he trained right-handed; his height, which only reached 1.52 m as an adult, was smaller than the rest of his opponents in the flyweight division.

Boxing career
He debuted as an amateur in January 1944 and would contest in 125 bouts winning 16 amateur championships, including the gold medal at the 1948 London Olympics. The first tournament he won was the Mendocino Novice Championship, in March 1944, just two months after his debut.

That same year, his father had to pay money to hire a farm laborer who could replace Perez in the vineyard, as a condition for granting legal consent required by the regulations on parental rights. His parents kept a reluctant attitude towards his plans, and he began fighting under the name Pablo Pérez to avoid being caught by them.

In 1946 and 1947, Pascual Perez won the Mendoza, Argentine and Latin American championships, and in 1948, he won the tournament where the Argentina Olympic boxing team was selected, every member of this team won medals at the Olympic Games.

London Olympics
In the 1948 London Olympics, Pascual Perez (then 22 years old) won the tenth Olympic gold medal for Argentina (in the same Games, Argentina won two others) and the sixth for boxing (the same day another gold medal was obtained by fellow Argentine Rafael Iglesias). Perez had never fought outside of South America and was to compete in the same division with, and possibly fight against, the European champion, the Spanish Luis Martínez Zapata who, despite both him and Perez being respected by press and fans alike, was favored to win the gold. Initially Pascual Perez was mistakenly disqualified from the tournament when his official weight was mixed up with Arnoldo Parés, a boxer in a heavier class. However, after the confusion was cleared, Perez was cleared to box and the disqualification was rescinded.

Perez first faced the Philippine Ricardo Adolfo, winning by RSC (stoppage by the referee) in the second round. In the second match he faced the South African Desmond Williams, also winning by RSC, this time, in the third round. In the quarterfinals he defeated the Belgian Alex Bollaert and in the semifinals he beat the Czech František Majdloch.

In the finals, Pérez faced the Italian Spartacus Bandinelli (28 years old), who had an upset victory in the quarterfinals over the favored Martínez Zapata. In the first round, Perez dominated the match with his aggressive style, controlling the initial offensive of the Italian, with several successions of punches landed, including a strong right he landed at the end of the round. The second round was very intense, with Bandinelli fighting aggressively to recover points and Perez answering blow for blow, using his greater mobility to score points with his left forehand, taking advantage of the Italian's tendency to keep his guard down. In the third round Perez again took the offensive from the start with a succession of direct left and right punches to Bandinelli's face.  Momentum swung several times, eventually with the Italian taking the offensive. Then the Argentine stopped the Italian's counterattack with an uppercut, and the round ended with each exchanging blows in the center of the ring.

Felix Frascara of Figura magazine, covered the match and after Perez' victory commented:

Perez was labeled a hero in Mendoza, where the provincial parliament gave him a house and a job. Notably, in the next tournament held to select Argentine boxers for the 1952 Olympic Games, Perez lost a match by split decision, to Francisco Calvagno, being eliminated from the tournament. The chosen Argentine representative was Alberto Barenghi, who was eliminated in the first fight. After his removal, Perez decided to enter professional boxing, and two years later became the first world boxing champion form Argentina. His last amateur fight was November 14 of 1952, in the Golden Strip Club winning by points in five rounds against Paul Rapretti.

Professional career
Pérez made his professional career with manager Lazarus Koci, who also managed José María Mono Gatica, and reorganized professional boxing in Argentina.

On December 5, 1952, Pérez beat José Ciorino by knockout in round four at the small Argentine city of Gerly, to begin his professional boxing career. After winning his first six fights by knockout, he challenged Marcelo Quiroga, November 11 of 1953, for the Argentine Flyweight title, winning the fight by a fourth-round knockout at Buenos Aires.

Pérez's knockout streak reached 18 knockouts in a row, and it lasted until he met Juan Bishop, on April 22, 1954, winning by a ten-round decision.

On July 24 of that year, and with a record of 23 wins, no losses, with 22 wins by knockout, Pérez met Yoshio Shirai, who, coincidentally, had been Japan's first world champion in history, in a non-title fight held at Buenos Aires. The Argentine ambassador in Japan, Carlos Quiroz, at the direction of then-President Juan D. Peron, took steps to set up a match in Buenos Aires against Shirai, without the title at stake. The fight took ten rounds at Luna Park on July 24 of 1954, with the presence of President Perón, sitting ringside . The match ended tied and was an extraordinary event in the country, for the first time an Argentine professional boxer was not defeated by a world champion. The tie forced Yoshio Shirai, as was standard in the boxing world then, to grant a rematch against the Argentine boxer again in a fight with the title at stake.

Flyweight world title
On November 26 of 1954, Pérez fought what was both his first fight abroad outside the Olympics, and his first world title fight. The Argentine knocked down the champion in the 2nd round and again in the 12th, in which the champion returned to his corner almost knocked out. From rounds 13 - 15, Perez nearly knocked out Shirai several times. After the fight, the score reflected a wide difference unanimously in favor of the Argentine. Referee Jack Sullivan had it 146–139, Judge Bill Pacheco, 143–139, and judge Kuniharu Hayashi, 146-143 all in Perez' favor. He made history by beating Shirai by a fifteen-round decision, becoming Argentina's first world champion boxer, in Tokyo. Pascualito became the smallest flyweight boxer to win a title.

Over the course of Pérez's next fights, he would defend his title only nine times, lose for the first time, and fight in Brazil, the Dominican Republic, Curaçao, Japan, Paraguay, the Philippines, Thailand, Uruguay and Venezuela. Many of his fights would have been title fights, but some of his opponents were not able to make the Flyweight division's 112 pound weight limit, so Pérez often had to settle for non-title wins instead. He lost his undefeated record to Japan's Sadao Yaoita on January 16 of 1959, by a ten-round decision in Tokyo. Among the fighters he defeated to retain his world title were Dai Dower (by a first-round knockout), Dommy Ursua (by a fifteen-round decision) and Yaoita in a rematch, by a thirteenth-round knockout.

Pérez would lose his title to another first time world champion, Thailand's Pone Kingpetch, who made history for his country by beating Pérez by a fifteen-round decision at Bangkok on April 16, 1960. A rematch between Pérez and Kingpetch was fought on September 22 of the same year, at Los Angeles, but Pérez's first fight in the United States was also his first knockout defeat, as he was beaten in eight rounds by Kingpetch.

Later fights
Pérez won his next twenty-eight bouts, mostly against nondescript opposition but he did score a pair of victories over the once-promising but by then fading Uruguayan Waldemiro Torres. Then, after dropping a split decision to Filipino veteran Leo Zulueta and outpointing Panamanian journeyman Manuel Moreno in his next two bouts, he faced perennial world title contender Bernardo Caraballo in Colombia on July 23, 1963. Pérez lost by a ten-round decision.

He finished his career with fights in Ecuador, Mexico and Panama, going 1-2 including losing by third-round knockout to future world flyweight champion Efren Torres in his fight on Mexican soil. His final fight, at the age of 37, was against Panamanian Eugenio Hurtado, who won by technical knock-out on March 15, 1964.

Pérez had a record of 84 wins, 7 losses and 1 draw, with 58 knockouts, number which places him in the exclusive group of boxers to have won 50 or more fights by knockout.

Awards and legacy
He has been inducted into both the International Boxing Hall of Fame and the World Boxing Hall of Fame.
On his death in 1977, Pascual Pérez was interred in the La Chacarita Cemetery in Buenos Aires, Argentina.

In 1955 he was awarded the Gold Olimpia Award. Perez in 1977 entered the International Boxing Hall of Fame organized by the magazine Ring. In 1995, the Hall of Fame in Canastota (IBHOF) did the same, where he is included with Argentine boxers Carlos Monzon, Nicolino Locche, and Victor Galindez. In 2004, he was officially declared the South American champion, by the American Boxing Confederation.

The Mendoza Boxing Palace of the Mendoza Boxing Federation, reopened in 2007, named Estadio Pascual Perez, in his memory.

In 1954, writer Rafael Lauria and musicians Hector Maure and Sergio Gasparini composed a tango titled "The great champion," recorded by Hector Maure, part of which reads:

Prominent journalist Chon Romero praised Pascual Perez in the following statement:

In 1980, with the first edition of the Konex Awards, the Konex Foundation awarded a Diploma of Merit to Perez as one of the top 5 boxers in the history of Argentina.

Boxrec.com ranks Pérez as the number one flyweight of all time.

Throughout his career Pascual Perez won 18 tournaments, including:

Amateurs
1944: Mendocino Tournament Novices
1944: Argentine Championship Novice
1945: Open Tournament Salta.
1946 Mendocino Veterans Championships
1946: Veteran Argentine Championship
1946: Latin American Championship (shared)
1947 Mendocino Veterans Championships
1947: Veteran Argentine Championship
1947: Latin American Championship (shared)
1948 Vintage Championship
1948: Veteran Argentine Championship (Olympic Team)
1948: Olympic Champion in London
1950: Mendocino Veterans Championships
1950: Veteran Argentine Championship
1950: Latin American Championship
1950: Good Neighbour Tournament (Lima)

Professional
1953: Argentine Professional Flyweight Championship
1954: World Flyweight Championship
2004: South American Champion, officially declared post mortem by the American Boxing Confederation.

Professional boxing record

References

External links

 Pasqual Perez - CBZ Profile
 
 https://boxrec.com/media/index.php/National_Boxing_Association%27s_Quarterly_Ratings:_1954
 https://boxrec.com/media/index.php/National_Boxing_Association%27s_Quarterly_Ratings:_1955
 https://boxrec.com/media/index.php/National_Boxing_Association%27s_Quarterly_Ratings:_1956
 https://boxrec.com/media/index.php/National_Boxing_Association%27s_Quarterly_Ratings:_1957
 https://boxrec.com/media/index.php/National_Boxing_Association%27s_Quarterly_Ratings:_1958
 https://boxrec.com/media/index.php/National_Boxing_Association%27s_Quarterly_Ratings:_1959
 https://boxrec.com/media/index.php/National_Boxing_Association%27s_Quarterly_Ratings:_1960

1926 births
1977 deaths
Sportspeople from Mendoza Province
Olympic boxers of Argentina
Boxers at the 1948 Summer Olympics
International Boxing Hall of Fame inductees
Flyweight boxers
Olympic gold medalists for Argentina
World boxing champions
World flyweight boxing champions
World Boxing Association champions
Olympic medalists in boxing
Burials at La Chacarita Cemetery
Deaths from liver disease
Argentine male boxers
Medalists at the 1948 Summer Olympics